Cottonwood Township is one of eight townships in Cumberland County, Illinois, USA.  As of the 2010 census, its population was 521 and it contained 231 housing units.

Geography
The Embarras River defines the township's eastern border.

Unincorporated towns
 Bradbury at 
 Janesville at 
 Johnstown at

Cemeteries
The township contains these three cemeteries: Haggins, Hutton and Tippett.

Airports and landing strips
 Thornton Airport

Demographics

School districts
 Charleston Community Unit School District 1
 Cumberland Community Unit School District 77
 Neoga Community Unit School District 3

Political districts
 State House District 109
 State Senate District 55

References
 
 United States Census Bureau 2009 TIGER/Line Shapefiles
 United States National Atlas

External links
 City-Data.com
 Illinois State Archives
 Township Officials of Illinois

Adjacent townships 

Townships in Cumberland County, Illinois
Charleston–Mattoon, IL Micropolitan Statistical Area
1860 establishments in Illinois
Populated places established in 1860
Townships in Illinois